Nicholas Netterville may refer to:
 Nicholas Netterville, 1st Viscount Netterville
 Nicholas Netterville, 5th Viscount Netterville